Henryk Juliusz Krukowicz-Przedrzymirski (27 March 1889 – 8 September 1944) was a Polish figure skater who competed in men's singles and pair skating.

Representing Austria-Hungary as a single skater, Krukowicz-Przedrzymirski won the bronze medal at the 1908 European Figure Skating Championships in Warsaw. He was also selected to represent Poland at the 1924 Winter Olympics in pair skating, but did not compete. He was killed during the Warsaw Uprising.

Competitive highlights

Men 

* as S. Przedrzymirski / Representing Austria (due to Partitions of Poland, lasting between 1772 and 1918)

Pairs 
With Olga Przedrzymirska (born Poźniakówna)

References 

1889 births
1944 deaths
Austrian male single skaters
Polish male pair skaters
Place of birth missing
Figure skaters at the 1924 Winter Olympics
European Figure Skating Championships medalists
Olympic figure skaters of Poland
Warsaw Uprising insurgents
Resistance members killed by Nazi Germany
Polish civilians killed in World War II